Jeremaine Copeland (born February 19, 1977) is a former professional gridiron football wide receiver who is currently the wide receivers coach for the Saskatchewan Roughriders of the Canadian Football League. He has played with the Montreal Alouettes, Calgary Stampeders, and Toronto Argonauts, as well as in the XFL and NFL Europe.

Early years
Copeland was born in Harriman, Tennessee. He would attend Harriman High School, where he played on the Blue Devils football team. While at Harriman, Copeland played at both running back and wide receiver.

College career
Copeland attended the University of Tennessee, where he played under head coach Phillip Fulmer from the 1995 season to the 1998 season.

1995 season
As a freshman with the Volunteers, Copeland played as a running back some. He recorded 14 rushes for 73 yards and two touchdowns on the season.

1996 season
As a sophomore with the Volunteers, Copeland played both at running back and wide receiver. He recorded 17 rushes for 72 yards and two touchdowns. In addition, he had 16 receptions for 191 yards. In addition, he returned 11 punts for the team.

1997 season
As a junior with the Volunteers, Copeland played at wide receiver. He recorded 58 receptions for 732 yards and nine touchdowns. In addition, he returned seven punts for the team.

1998 season

In the 1998 season, Copeland and the Volunteers would have a very successful season. The team won the National Championship over Florida State in the Fiesta Bowl. In the 23-16 victory, Copeland had one reception for 15 yards. The National Championship was Copeland's last collegiate game. On the season, he recorded 29 receptions for 438 yards and one touchdown. He retained duties for returning punts with 16 tries on the season.

With the Volunteers, he recorded 103 receptions for 1,361 yards, for a 13.32 yards per reception average, and rushed 31 times for 145 yards and four rushing touchdowns in his collegiate career. At Tennessee, he played with quarterback Peyton Manning and running back Jamal Lewis while wearing #6 for the Vols.

Professional career
Copeland played a year of NFL Europe football for the Barcelona Dragons. He ended the season with a team leading 74 receptions for 821 yards, for an 11.1 yards per reception average, and six touchdowns.

Copeland began his CFL career with the Montreal Alouettes in 2001 and played six games. During that season, he also starred at wide receiver with the XFL's champion Los Angeles Xtreme. He was known for his flashy big plays and the famous long skull cap tail hanging out of his helmet during his time with the XFL. After beginning the 2002 season in the Dallas Cowboys' training camp, Copeland returned to the Alouettes and contributed to their Grey Cup championship that year. Copeland picked up CFL and CFLPA all-star honours in 2003 after piling up 99 receptions and 1,757 receiving yards.  Along with teammate slotback Ben Cahoon, Copeland set a CFL record for most receiving yards by two teammates, amassing 3,318 yards between them.  In 2004, Copeland was one of four receivers with the Alouettes to eclipse the 1,000-yard receiving mark (the others were Cahoon, Thyron Anderson, and Kwame Cavil), a CFL record which was repeated by the Alouettes the following year.

In 2005, Copeland was lured west to join the Calgary Stampeders after he entered free agency.  Although his statistics did not reach the same levels as those achieved with the Alouettes, Copeland and Stampeder teammate Nik Lewis became infamous for their elaborate touchdown celebrations, including a "human bicycle" during the 2005 season, and the "bobsled" at the endzone pylon during the 2006 season. On November 23, 2008, Copeland and teammates of the Calgary Stampeders won the Grey Cup against the hosting Montreal Alouettes, 22-14. In 2009, Copeland enjoyed his best season since 2003 when he recorded 1,235 receiving yards and led the league with 12 receiving touchdowns, earning CFL all-star honours that year.

On February 17, 2010, Copeland was traded to the Toronto Argonauts in exchange for wide receiver P. K. Sam. He was elected as the team's offensive captain, leading an inexperienced receiving corps and being a crutch for inexperienced CFL quarterback Cleo Lemon. With the team, he was reunited with former XFL teammate Noel Prefontaine. On November 3, 2011, he surpassed the 10,000 career receiving yards mark, becoming the 15th CFL player to reach the milestone.

On January 25, 2012, Copeland officially retired from the CFL after 11 seasons in professional football.

Coaching career
After announcing his retirement from professional football, Copeland was named the wide receivers coach of the Hamilton Tiger-Cats, joining former offensive coordinator George Cortez who was the team's head coach at the time. Following the 2012 season, Copeland left the Tiger-Cats to complete his degree at the University of Tennessee.

On February 20, 2015, the Saskatchewan Roughriders announced that Copeland would be their new receivers coach.

CFL statistics

References

Further reading

External links
 Toronto Argonauts bio page

1977 births
Living people
African-American players of American football
African-American players of Canadian football
American football wide receivers
Barcelona Dragons players
Calgary Stampeders players
Canadian football wide receivers
Los Angeles Xtreme players
Montreal Alouettes players
People from Harriman, Tennessee
Tennessee Volunteers football players
Toronto Argonauts players
Hamilton Tiger-Cats coaches
Saskatchewan Roughriders coaches
21st-century African-American sportspeople
20th-century African-American sportspeople